Ísak Guttormsson was, from 1583 to 1588, Lawman of the Faroe Islands.

Ísak Guttormsson lived on Suðuroy, Faroe Islands, where he had land in Nes and Vágur. He was the son of Guttormur Andrasson, former Lawman of the Faroe Islands. Little else is known about Guttormsson.

References

G.V.C. Young's textbook Færøerne - fra vikingetiden til reformationen, 1982
Løgtingið 150 - Hátíðarrit. Tórshavn 2002, Bind 2, S. 366. (Avsnitt Føroya løgmenn fram til 1816) (PDF-Download)

Lawmen of the Faroe Islands
16th-century heads of government
Year of birth unknown
Year of death unknown
16th-century Norwegian people